In The Gambia, Mandinka is spoken as a first language by 38% of the population, Pulaar by 21%, Wolof by 18%, Soninke by 9 percent, Jola by 4.5 percent, Serer by 2.4 percent, Manjak and Bainouk by 1.6 percent each, Portuguese Creole by 1 percent, and English by 0.5 percent. Smaller numbers speak several other languages. Gambian Sign Language is used by the deaf. English is the main language for official purposes and education.

See also

 Demographics of the Gambia

References